Kruth is a commune in the Haut-Rhin department in Grand Est in north-eastern France. Its railway station is the terminus of a TER service to Mulhouse.

Geography

Climate
Kruth has a humid continental climate (Köppen climate classification Dfb) closely bordering on a oceanic climate (Cfb).

See also
 Communes of the Haut-Rhin département

References

Communes of Haut-Rhin
Haut-Rhin communes articles needing translation from French Wikipedia